Antonio Irineo Villarreal González (July 16, 1877 in Lampazos, Mexico – December 16, 1944 in Mexico City) was a Mexican politician and soldier.

From 1903, Villarreal turned against the dictatorship of Porfirio Díaz. He published a number of liberal magazines and was subsequently imprisoned. After his release he fled to the United States where he joined,  the anarchist  Mexican Liberal Party (PLM) of Ricardo Flores Magón. At the outbreak of the Mexican Revolution in 1910, he joined the Progressive Constitutionalist Party (PCP) of  Francisco Madero, and after Madero's victory in 1911 he was appointed consul in Barcelona.

After the coup attempt and assassination of Madero by Victoriano Huerta in 1913 he returned to Mexico. He joined the constitutionalist army of Pablo González Garza and Venustiano Carranza. He took part in the Convention of Aguascalientes, and remained as one of the few neutrals there when Villa and Carranza together walked out. On 31 October 1914, he was elected president of the convention, but  soon handed over  that function to Eulalio Gutiérrez. Villarreal was then made governor of Nuevo León, where he had a number of progressive reforms. A year later he was ousted by the forces of Carranza and he was forced to flee the country.

After the death of Carranza in 1920 he returned, and became minister of agriculture under Álvaro Obregón. In 1922 he stood for election as senator, but his victory was withheld. A year later he joined the De la Huertaopstand, but that organisation was suppressed, and he was forced to leave the country again. In 1929 he supported National Anti-Reelectionist Party and the presidential campaign of José Vasconcelos. In the disputed result of the election, he again fled the country again.

In 1934, he was presidential candidate for the Confederation of Independent Revolutionary Party, but got only 1.08% of the vote. After that, he retired from politics. He died in 1944.

His two sisters Teresa Villarreal and Andrea Villarreal both had careers as political agitators for the Mexican revolution from a base in exile in the United States.

References

 Lucas Alamán, Historia de México desde los primeros movimientos que prepararon su independencia en 1808 hasta la época presente (History of Mexico from the First Movements in Preparation for Independence in 1808 until the Present Period). México DF: Fondo de Cultura Económica, 1985
 Carmen Blázquez Domínguez, Veracruz, una historia compartida, Gobierno del Estado de Veracruz, Instituto Veracruzano de Cultura, 1988.
 Francisco Bulnes, La guerra de Independencia. México, DF, 1910.
 Carlos María de Bustamante, Cuadro histórico de la Revolución mexicana. México DF: INEHRM, 1843 (réimpr. 1985)
 Luis Garfias Magana, Guerrilleros de México: Personajes famosos y sus hazanas, desde la Independencia hasta le Revolución mexicana. México DF: Panorama, 1980.
 Luis Pazos, Historia sinóptica de México de los Olmecas a Salinas. México DF: Diana, 1993.
 Guillermo Prieto, Memorias de mis tiempos [1828]. Editorial Pátria, 1906.
 Vicente Rivas Palacio (coord.), Julio Zárate, México a través de los siglos: Vol. III : La guerra de independencia (1808–1821). México DF: Cumbre, 1880 (réimpr. 1970)
 Vicente Rivas Palacio (coord.), Juan de Dios Arias, Enrique de Olavarría y Ferrari, México a través de los siglos, vol. IV : México independiente (1821–1855) [1880]. México DF: Cumbre, 1970.
 John W. Sherman, "Revolution on Trial: The 1909 Tombstone Proceedings Against Ricardo Flores Magón, Antonio Villarreal, and Librado Rivera," Journal of Arizona History vol. 32, no. 2 (Summer 1991), pp. 173-194. In JSTOR
 Various Authors, Rulers of Nuevo León: History (1579 - 1989).'' Mexico, DF: JR Fortson and CIA., Inc. Publishers, 1990.

1877 births
1944 deaths
People of the Mexican Revolution
Mexican anarchists
Porfiriato